The 1969 Coppa Italia Final was the final group of the 1968–69 Coppa Italia. From 1968 to 1971, FIGC introduced a final group instead of semi-finals and finals. In the final group, four teams played against each other home-and-away in a round-robin format. The matches were played from 30 April – 29 June 1969. The group winner was Roma.

Matches

Final group

References 
Coppa Italia 1968/69 statistics at rsssf.com
 https://www.calcio.com/calendario/ita-coppa-italia-1968-1969-finale/2/
 https://www.worldfootball.net/schedule/ita-coppa-italia-1968-1969-finale/2/
https://www.footballhistory.org/tournament/coppa-italia.html
https://www.asroma.com/en/news/2015/12/roma-and-the-coppa-italia-i

Coppa Italia Finals
Coppa Italia Final 1969